G-Series is a major Bangladeshi record label. The company produces and publishes cassettes, CDs, VCDs, and DVDs of dramas, telefilms, movies, and music. It is one of the largest such companies in Bangladesh. The owner of the company is Nazmul Haque Bhuiyan, popularly known as Khaled. The Daily Star described it a major record label in Bangladesh.

History
G-Series was established in 1983 by Nazmul Haque Bhuiyan. In 2006, Agniveena production was founded as a sister concern of G-Series. G-series is named after the famous book of poems, Gitanjali of Rabindranath Tagore. In 2007, G-Series was seeing a decline in the sale of compact disks due to piracy.

In 2010, for the Eid market, G-series and Agniveena, its sister concern, released 30 albums. The same year the company partnered with BBC World Service Trust to launch BBC Janala on CD. BBC Janala is  a program of the trust, English in action, with an aim of making English lessons more accessible.

In 2011, G-Series partnered with Nescafé to launch Get Set Rock, a talent hunt which was won by S.I.X. G-Series released an album of the winner, S.I.X, and the runner-up, Rang, titled Nescafé 'Get Set Rock.

Artists

Musicians
 Niaz Mohammad Chowdhury
 Happy Akhand
Atikur Rahman Mahi
 Shahnaz Rahmatullah
 Shantanu Biswas
 Sania Sultana Liza
 Robi Chowdhury
 Bassbaba-Sumon
Fuad Al Muktadir
 Parveen Sultana
 Tahsan Rahman Khan

Bands
 Aurthohin
 Stoic Bliss
 Shironamhin
 Black
 Artcell

See also
 List of Bangladeshi record labels

References

External links
 G-Series Official Website

Bangladeshi record labels
G-Series
G-Series
1983 establishments in Bangladesh